Robert Ryan (July 9, 1878 – November 9, 1954) was a politician from Quebec, Canada.

An accountant by profession, he was a Liberal candidate in the federal district of Three Rivers and St. Maurice in 1925, but lost.

He ran again in the district of Three Rivers in 1940 and won.  In 1945 though, Ryan was defeated by Independent Liberal Wilfrid Gariépy.

Footnotes

1878 births
1954 deaths
Liberal Party of Canada MPs
Members of the House of Commons of Canada from Quebec